The Ivan Cankar District is a city district of the City Municipality of Maribor in northeastern Slovenia. It is named after Ivan Cankar, one of Slovenia's greatest writers. In 2014, the district had a population of 7,242.

References

Districts of the City Municipality of Maribor